Blackstone House and Martinsville Telephone Company Building, also known as Cure and Hensley Mortuary, consists of two historic buildings located at Martinsville, Morgan County, Indiana.  The buildings were connected in the early 1960s.  The house was built in 1860, and is a two-story, Gothic Revival style brick building with a steep cross-gable roof.  A Queen Anne style wraparound porch with corner turret was added in 1890. The Martinsville Telephone Company Building was built in 1927, and is a one-story, flat roofed, Tudor Revival style "oriental brick" and limestone building.  It features a crenellated parapet.  It housed a telephone exchange until 1957.

It was listed on the National Register of Historic Places in 1997.  It is located in the Martinsville Commercial Historic District.

References

Commercial buildings on the National Register of Historic Places in Indiana
Gothic Revival architecture in Indiana
Queen Anne architecture in Indiana
Tudor Revival architecture in Indiana
Houses completed in 1860
Commercial buildings completed in 1927
Buildings and structures in Morgan County, Indiana
National Register of Historic Places in Morgan County, Indiana
Historic district contributing properties in Indiana